Beverly Hills Weekly is the free weekly tabloid-sized newspaper serving Beverly Hills, CA. It was founded on October 7, 1999. The publisher is Josh E. Gross, son of television writer Jack Gross Jr., and the grandson of KFMB-TV founder Jack O. Gross, which was the first television station in San Diego.  The paper has been described as the "go-to publication for reporting on school information, birth announcements, local government issues and opinions" in Beverly Hills.

In 2014, Beverly Hills Weekly won a lawsuit brought by competitor The Beverly Hills Courier.  Beverly Hills Weekly responded with a SLAPP motion and ultimately received $40,000 in legal fees. The Weekly was represented by attorney Ronald Richards.

The newspaper is also a sponsor of the Beverly Hills 9/11 Memorial Garden.

As of 2020, the publication has published over 1100 issues.

See also 
 The Beverly Hills Courier
 Beverly Hills Post
 Canyon News

References

External links

Archives - hosted by SmallTownPapers.com

Newspapers published in Beverly Hills, California
Free newspapers
Independent newspapers published in the United States
Publications established in 1999